Duun is a Mande language of Mali. There are three varieties of Duun, West Duun, or Duungooma (also known as Du, Samogho-sien) and Banka or Bankagooma, in Mali, and East Duun, or Dzùùn(goo), in Burkina Faso. These are clearly distinct but have a reasonable degree of mutual intelligibility with each other.

Dialects of East Duun, Kpan (Kpango, Samoro-guan) and Dzùùngoo (Samogo-iri), are easily intelligible.

Phonology 
The phonology of the Dunn languages contains 26 consonants and 12 vowels. The following phonemes are in the International Phonetic Alphabet (IPA).

References

Samogo languages
Languages of Mali